Tandoori Love is a 2008 Swiss comedy film about the misadventures of an Indian cook named Raja in Switzerland.

Cast
 Lavinia Wilson as Sonja
 Vijay Raaz as Rajah
 Martin Schick as Markus
 Shweta Agarwal as Priya
 Tamal Ray Chowdhury as Kamaal Khan
 Max Rüdlinger as Gusti (as Max Ruedlinger)
 Peter Glauser as Stammtisch Stöff
 Rene Blum as Karli (as René Blum)
 Verena Zimmermann as Rosmarie Kübli
 Asif Basra as T.V. Kumar, the producer
 Aasif Sheikh as Superstar Ramesh 
 Gilles Tschudi as Jules Renaud
 Ganesh Yadav as J.R., the director
 Asha Sachdev as Priya's Mother
 Johanna Bantzer as Anita

Crew
 Marcel Vaid, music

References

External links 
 

2008 films
2008 comedy films
Swiss comedy films
Swiss German-language films
2000s German-language films